Samuel Kwadwo Amoako (born 20 March 1943) is a Ghanaian politician and a member of the 5th Parliament of the 4th Republic of Ghana. He was once the member of Parliament for Akim Abuakwa North constituency in the Eastern Region of Ghana. He is a member of the New Patriotic Party.

Early life and education 
Samuel Kwadwo Amoako was born on 20 March 1943 in Kukurantumi-Akim in the Eastern Region of Ghana. He attended Howard University in Washington DC, Columbia University in New York  all in the year 1986.

Career 
Amoako was a lecturer at City University of New York.

Politics 
Amoako was first elected into parliament on the ticket of NPP during the December 2008 Ghanaian General Elections as member of parliament for Akim Abuakwa North constituency.

He obtained 14,820 votes out of the 25,071 valid votes cast representing 59.10%. He however lost his party's parliamentary primaries in 2012 to Joseph Boakye Danquah Adu.

Personal life 
Amoako is married with six children. He is a Christian and a member of the Methodist church.

References 

1943 births
Living people
Howard University alumni
New Patriotic Party politicians
Columbia University alumni
Ghanaian MPs 2009–2013
People from Eastern Region (Ghana)
Ghanaian Methodists